Stoll Vaughan is a singer-songwriter from Lexington, Kentucky.  He is the great-nephew of United States Senator John Sherman Cooper. Vaughan began his professional music career as guitar player for the Indiana band Chamberlain. He attended the Interlochen Arts Academy in Interlochen, Michigan.

Vaughan has toured through much of the United States as well as Europe.  In the Netherlands, his debut album was named one of "Alternative Country's Top Ten Records of the Year." He has toured with John Mellencamp and John Fogerty's 'Words and Music' tour, Farm Aid, Def Leppard, Journey, Shooter Jennings, Marty Stuart, Robert Earl Keen, James McMurtry, and Don Williams.

Vaughan's first two CD releases Love Like a Mule, and Hold On Through Sleep and Dreams both landed in the Top 10 of the Americana Music Charts.

Vaughan's music has been featured on television shows such as; True Blood, Friday Night Lights, Shameless (U.S. TV series), and The Office (U.S. TV series) (3 songs in the series finale). He composed original music for the David Lynch Interview Project that won a webbie, as well as music for The Making of There Will Be Blood Blu-ray Release.

Vaughan is actively composing original musical content for a new amazon TV pilot to be released in August 2014. Aside from his own compositions and performances, Stoll Vaughan is currently Head of A&R for CUT Recordings where he is writing and developing various singer-songwriters- including Duane Betts, son of Dickey Betts of the Allman Brothers. Vaughan and Betts wrote and produced a song for the movie World Made Straight starring Steve Earle to be released February 2015.

In his free time Vaughan guest lectures for the University of Montana Entertainment Management Program where he offers his professional insight in artist development.

Vaughan's latest project The Living Record is a live recording continuation done in CUT Recordings studio in front of a live audience.

Discography

 2005 – Hold on Thru Sleep and Dreams [Shadow Dog]
 Desire'
 Nowhere
 Sounds of the City
 No Use to Me Now
 I-75
 Coming to Me Now
 Pride Hides
 American Life
 Leaf on a River
 Memories

 2006 – Love Like a Mule [Shadow Dog]

 Alright
 No Stopping
 Savior
 Man That Cares
 Complain
 Between You and I
 Fade Away
 Lonesome
 Seen Moments
 Love Like a Mule
 Head Above the Wheel

 2010 – The Weatherman Dualtone

The Weatherman
Troubles
Coming Back Now
Further Down the Line
Whistling in the Dark 	
Closer Stoll Vaughan 	
Meet You in the Middle 	
War On Love
Maria

References

External links
 Stoll Vaughan on Pure Volume
 Stoll Vaughan on Last.FM
 Stoll Vaughan Photoblog on Buzznet
 Stoll Vaughan Fan Club
 Stoll Vaughan Message Board
 Paste Magazine Article About Fire
 Green Bay Press Gazette Article About Fire
 Folk and Acoustic Music Exchange Review, 2006
 Knox News Interview, 2005
 Music Rebellion Podcast Interview, 2006
 WoodSongs Old-Time Radio Hour Show 380, 2006
 Justin Press Review, July 29, 2006
 San Antonio Express-News Interview, July 27, 2006
 Flagpole Magazine Article, August 9, 2005|

Living people
American country singer-songwriters
American male singer-songwriters
Musicians from Lexington, Kentucky
Writers from Lexington, Kentucky
Country musicians from Kentucky
Singer-songwriters from Kentucky
Year of birth missing (living people)